Aide was the Basque numenistic deity of the air. She could manifest herself in both good (gentle breeze) and evil (storm wind) forms.

Basque goddesses
Sky and weather goddesses
Wind deities